Rainforest Cafe is a jungle-themed restaurant chain owned by Landry's, Inc., of Houston. It was founded by Prince Iaukea.  The first location opened in the Mall of America in Bloomington, Minnesota, on February 3, 1994. By 1997, the chain consisted of six restaurants, all in the United States. The first international location opened in London, England in June 1997. In 1998, it was planned to build 12 additional restaurants in the United States, seven in Mexico, and five in the UK, for a total of 22 restaurants by 2008.

In 2000, the Rainforest Cafe was bought by Landry's Restaurants Inc., a company specializing in dining, hospitality, entertainment, and gaming, based in Houston, Texas. To date, the company owns restaurants in the United States, Canada, France, the United Arab Emirates, Japan, and Malta. Rainforest Cafe focuses on local tourism for a majority of their income.

Design

Each Rainforest Cafe restaurant is designed to depict the atmosphere of a tropical rainforest, including plant growth, fog machines, waterfalls, and rainforest animals. The ceiling and much of the walls are lined with artificial foliage, while lower areas and booth seating are decorated with faux rock. Brick textures suggest ancient ruins, and support pillars are made to look like tree trunks. Often, there is a waterfall with a fountain in the dining area, with a statue depicting Atlas holding up the Earth to communicate a conservation message. Paper Mache birds and butterflies are suspended from the trees, and other whimsical rainforest creatures are mounted, as though climbing on the walls or peeking through the foliage. The ceiling above the center of the dining room features a simulated starry night sky, designed and manufactured by Fiber Optic Systems Inc., located in Whitehouse Station, New Jersey. The bar area is situated under a gigantic mushroom, partitioned from the rest of the restaurant by a rain curtain. The chain is known for its characteristic bar stools, made to resemble the legs of animals, designed and sculpted by the artist Glenn Carter. Fish tanks, also known as aquariums with tropical reef fish are spread throughout the restaurant and the gift shop space. Periodically, a simulated thunderstorm will occur every few minutes, with strobe lights and thunder effects through subwoofers.

Animatronic animals are spread throughout the restaurant. These include butterflies, elephants, gorillas, jaguars, orangutans, chimpanzees, monkeys and tigers, though this will vary by location. The restaurant is laid out so that these animals are set off the ground and are largely above diners' heads, not only allowing them to be seen from farther away, but making them appear larger as well. A crocodile and a python are often located in the gift shop area to attract the attention of passersby. Tracy Tree, an animated tree face, sits inside the shop and provides rainforest facts. The animals are manufactured by Russells Creative, LLC, of Apopka, Florida, formerly UCFab International.

A retail village is located in front of the dining area with an assortment of souvenirs that are rainforest-themed or are branded with the Rainforest Cafe logo, mostly printed by the Atlanta-based fashion apparel company Boxercraft Inc. A small water feature with the animatronic crocodile (A hippo in Nashville) is located just outside the shop, in which visitors are invited to toss coins.

Rainforest Cafe also has a set of animal mascots, called "The Wild Bunch". These characters include Cha! Cha!, the red-eyed tree frog; Iggy, the iguana; Nile, the crocodile; Rio, the macaw; Maya, the jaguar; Tuki, the elephant; Bamba, the gorilla; and Ozzie, the orangutan. These eight characters may be represented on children's menus, merchandise, or the company logo.

Menu
Rainforest Cafe serves typical American chain restaurant fare, such as burgers, chicken, pastas, and seafood, with the addition of some Mexican food to reflect the tropical theme. Their signature dessert, called a volcano, consists of brownie and ice cream topped with a lit sparkler.

The restaurant also serves alcoholic beverages, some of which are reminiscent of those associated with tiki culture such as the Mai Tai.

Locations

U.S. locations
 Lake Buena Vista, Florida – Disney Springs (Opened on August 6, 1996, with about 450 seats)
 Bay Lake, Florida – Disney's Animal Kingdom (Opened on April 22, 1998)
 Atlantic City, New Jersey – Boardwalk (Opened April 2004)
 Edison, New Jersey – Menlo Park Mall (Opened on September 17, 1998)
 Bloomington, Minnesota – Third floor of Mall of America, relocated from the first floor (Original location opened on February 3, 1994; Relocated on January 22, 2016)
 Sunrise, Florida – Sawgrass Mills (Opened on November 20, 1996)
 Ontario, California – Ontario Mills (Opened on November 14, 1996)
 Tempe, Arizona – Arizona Mills (Opened on November 20, 1997)
 Grapevine, Texas – Grapevine Mills (Opened on October 30, 1997)
 Katy, Texas – Katy Mills (Opened on October 28, 1999)
 Galveston, Texas - (Opened on January 10, 2003)
 San Antonio, Texas – San Antonio River Walk (Opened January 2006)
 Gurnee, Illinois – Gurnee Mills (Opened in June 1996)
 Auburn Hills, Michigan – Great Lakes Crossing Outlets (Opened on November 12, 1998)
 Nashville, Tennessee – Opry Mills (Opened on May 12, 2000)
 Las Vegas, Nevada – Harmon Corner (Opened on September 2, 2015)

International locations
 Niagara Falls, Ontario, Canada – Clifton Hill (Opened in May 2001)
 Urayasu, Chiba, Japan – Ikspiari at Tokyo Disney Resort (Opened on July 7, 2000)
 Chessy, Seine-et-Marne, France – Disney Village at Disneyland Paris (Opened in 1999)
 Dubai, United Arab Emirates – Dubai Festival City (Opened in 2020)
 Abu Dhabi, United Arab Emirates – Yas Mall (Opened in November 2020)
 St. Julian's, Malta (Opened in Summer 2021)

Merchandise locations
Niagara Falls, New York - Sheraton at the Falls (Opened on June 3, 2015)

Former locations
 Anaheim, California – Downtown Disney (Opened on January 12, 2001; Closed on June 19, 2018)
 Farmington, Connecticut - Westfarms Mall (Opened 2000; Closed 2013)
 Houston, Texas – Houston Galleria Mall (Opened in Spring 2009; Closed in March 2018)
 San Francisco, California – Fisherman's Wharf (Opened in May 2000; Closed on October 1, 2017)
 Burlington, Massachusetts – Burlington Mall (Opened in October 1998; Closed on April 25, 2016)
 Las Vegas, Nevada – MGM Grand Hotel & Casino Las Vegas (Opened on December 18, 1997; Closed on August 30, 2015)
 Toronto, Ontario – Yorkdale Shopping Center (Opened on June 30, 1999, closed January 1, 2014.)
 Costa Mesa, California – South Coast Plaza (Opened June 9, 1997; closed on July 7, 2013)
 Pittsburgh, Pennsylvania – Warner Centre (Opened July 1997; Closed October 2001)
 Aventura, Florida – Aventura Mall (Opened on December 14, 1997; Closed in 2000)
 Overland Park, Kansas – Oak Park Mall (Opened on February 23, 1999; closed on January 6, 2009)
 Kowloon Tong, Hong Kong – Festival Walk (Opened November 24, 1998; closed on January 3, 2003)
 Norfolk, Virginia – MacArthur Center (Opened in June 1999; closed in 2001)
 Tysons Corner, Virginia – Tysons Corner Center (Opened in October 1996, Closed in 2007)
 Westbury, New York – The Source Mall (Opened in September 1997; closed on October 19, 2000)
 West Nyack, New York – Palisades Center (Opened on March 19, 1998; closed in 2002)
 Elizabeth, New Jersey – The Mills at Jersey Gardens (Opened on October 21, 1999; Closed in late 2000)
 Denver, Colorado, – Cherry Creek Shopping Center (Opened in Summer 1998; Closed in 2009)
 Towson, Maryland – Towson Town Center (Opened on March 23, 1999; Closed in January 2009)
 Toronto, Ontario – Scarborough Town Center, Opened in February 1999; closed on January 7, 2001)
 Manchester, England – Trafford Center (Closed in 2003)
 Burnaby, British Columbia – Metropolis at Metrotown (Opened in 1998, closed on September 2, 2001)
 Mexico City, Mexico – Metropol Entertainment Central (Closed in 2012)
 Cancún, Mexico – Plaza Forum by the Sea (Opened on August 15, 1997, closed in Fall 2010.)
 Tlalnepantla, Mexico – Mundo E (Opened on December 17, 1998; Closed sometime in the 2000s)
 Mexico City, Mexico – Centro Santa Fe (Closed in 2012)
 Istanbul, Turkey – İstinye Park (Closed in 2010.)
 Farmington, Connecticut – Westfarms Mall (Opened in February 2000; Closed in 2013)
 Cairo, Egypt – City Stars Mall (Opened in February 2008, closed approximately in 2012.)
 Philadelphia, Pennsylvania – Philadelphia Mills (formerly Franklin Mills) (Opened on November 27, 1998; Closed in February 2001)
 Tukwila, Washington – Westfield Southcenter (Opened on June 29, 1999; Closed in January 2016)
 Bloomington, Minnesota – First floor of Mall of America (Opened on February 3, 1994, with 295 seats, also the first location; Closed in September 2014 for relocation.)
3 Simei Street 6, Singapore – Eastpoint Shopping Mall (Closed sometime in the 2000s)
 Schaumburg, Illinois – Woodfield Mall (Opened on October 20, 1995, closed on January 1, 2020)
 Chicago, Illinois – Downtown Chicago (Opened on October 2, 1997, closed August 12, 2020)
 Dubai, United Arab Emirates – The Dubai Mall (Opened in 2009, closed in 2020, replaced by the Festival City Mall location)
 London, England – Piccadilly Circus (Opened on June 24, 1997, closed 2022 and rebranded as Jungle Cave)

Gallery

In popular culture
 The restaurant's former location in Burlington Mall in Burlington, Massachusetts, appeared in the 2009 film Paul Blart: Mall Cop.
 Rainforest Cafe sponsored Curious George on PBS Kids, replacing Amazon Grocery & Shea Homes.
 In 2022, YouTube content creators Eddy Burback and Ted Nivison visited and ate at every Rainforest Cafe location in North America, which was chronicled in two videos that went viral.

References

External links

 Official website

1994 establishments in Minnesota
2000 mergers and acquisitions
Animatronic attractions
Restaurants in Houston
Jungles in fiction
Restaurant chains in the United States
Restaurants established in 1994
Restaurants in Nashville, Tennessee
Theme restaurants